The 1992 NHL Entry Draft was the 30th NHL Entry Draft. It was held on June 20 at the Montreal Forum in Montreal, Quebec. A total of 264 players were drafted.

The last active player in the NHL from this draft class was Sergei Gonchar, who retired after the 2014–15 season.

Selections by round
Club teams are located in North America unless otherwise noted.

Round one

Round two

Round three

Round four

Round five

Round six

Round seven

Round eight

Round nine

Round ten

Round eleven

Draftees based on nationality

See also
 1992 NHL Expansion Draft
 1992 NHL Supplemental Draft
 1992–93 NHL season
 List of NHL players

References

External links
1992 NHL Entry Draft player stats at The Internet Hockey Database

Draft
National Hockey League Entry Draft